Frognal and Fitzjohns was a ward in the London Borough of Camden, the United Kingdom. The ward was created for the 2002 elections and covered the western areas of Hampstead, between Hampstead Village and Finchley Road and took its name from Frognal and Fitzjohn's Avenue. The population of this ward at the 2011 Census was 11,986.

Frognal and Fitzjohns was represented by three councillors on Camden Borough Council. The ward's last councillors were Siobhan Baillie, Andrew Mennear and Gio Spinella, all of the Conservative Party.

The ward was abolished for the 2022 election, and part of its area became the newly created Frognal ward, with a smaller area transferred to Belsize.

Notable former councillors include Siobhan Bailllie, MP for Stroud, Laura Trott, MP for Sevenoaks, and Gio Spinella, leader of the Conservative Group on Camden Council.

References

Election results
The last election was held on 22 May 2014.

Wards of the London Borough of Camden
2002 establishments in England
2022 disestablishments in England
Frognal